The Wild Center, formerly known as the Natural History Museum of the Adirondacks, is a natural history center in Tupper Lake, New York, near the center of New York state's Adirondack Park.

Exhibits
The center mixes up the indoors and outdoors on a trail-filled  campus. The center opened Wild Walk in 2015, a thousand feet of bridges and platforms that rise up and eventually over the forest on the center's campus. In addition to the outdoor experiences there are five primary indoor exhibit areas, The Pataki Hall of the Adirondacks contains The Living River Trail that circles the hall with live animal exhibits and a waterfall with the center's live otters. There are approximately 50 species of live animals at the center, many of them in habitats in this hall. The Big Wolf Great Hall contains a lean-to and the glacial ice wall and is the site for the center's live animal encounters. The Naturalist Cabinet contains hands-on exhibits and collections. Other exhibit areas include the Flammer Panoramas Theater where films are screened, and Planet Adirondacks, an installation of the NOAA's Science on a Sphere  with shows focusing on the relationship between the Adirondacks and the rest of the Earth. The center features live exhibits and live animals, including river otters, birds, amphibians and fish. Indoors, a marsh appears to flow into a real pond that laps at the outside of the building, and the calls of live owls and otters mix with the splashing cascade of a trout-filled indoor stream. High definition films in a wide-screen theater explore the region and showcase fascinating reports from field scientists researching everything from moose to loons to alpine summits.

The center also includes outdoor exhibits that take visitors into the ecosystems that surround the center. There are canoe trips available on the river that runs through its campus. Daily guided trail walks are also offered. The walks are on provided snow shoes in the winter.

Awards
The center was named a 2015 finalist for the National Medal, the nation's highest honor for museums in service of their communities. This center is the first LEED museum in New York. It earned a silver LEED award from the U.S. Green Building Council. The center has an extensive exhibit that details the LEED aspects of its facility.

Programs
The center plays a role in a range of Adirondack projects, sponsoring a community maple sugar operation, sponsoring an annual youth summit that brings college and high school students together to research climate impacts and develop campus action plans. It has partnered in this effort with the Association of Science and Technology Centers (ASTC), and Heureka Science Center in Finland.

Design
The building and the exhibits were designed by The Office of Charles P. Reay with Fish Partners and the St. Louis architectural firm HOK.  The Bio Building was designed by local architecture firm Phinney Design Group, based in Saratoga Springs. It opened on July 4, 2006.

See also
Adirondack Museum

References

External links 
 
 

Natural history museums in New York (state)
Museums in Franklin County, New York
Adirondacks
Museums established in 2006
Adirondack Park
Nature centers in New York (state)